Business Events Sydney, formerly known as Sydney Convention and Visitors Bureau, markets Sydney and New South Wales as a destination for Australian and international business meetings, incentives, conventions, and exhibitions. On average, Business Events Sydney secures 70 international events and welcomes 60,000 delegates per year.

Business Events Sydney is a not-for-profit membership based organization that provides assistance and advice on planning and holding events in Sydney. They are also responsible for marketing Sydney and New South Wales as a business events destination to individuals and organizations to Australia and the world.
They help to bid on, win and hold conferences, major events, conventions, business meetings and congresses in Sydney.

At the state level, they operate AccessNSW, a service for planning events, conferences and incentives throughout New South Wales.

History 
Business Events Sydney is a 40-year partnership between the Government of New South Wales and the tourism industry. Before 1 September 2008, Business Events Sydney was known as the Sydney Convention and Visitors Bureau.

Funding 
Business Events Sydney is a not–for-profit organisation and is jointly supported by the NSW Government and the membership base.

Green Sydney 
Business Events Sydney promotes Sydney as an environmentally friendly city, due to the actions of citizens, businesses and local movements.

Business Events Sydney supports the Green Meetings Industry Council's 2020 agenda for what should comprise a 'green meeting'. These are conferences, events, incentives and meetings that:

 Have zero net environmental effect
 Fully integrate environmental responsibility into return-on-investment (ROI) analysis
 Are accepted and standard industry practice
 Achieve economic and strategic business goals
 Minimise or eliminate environmental impacts, and
 Positively contribute to the environment and host communities

Business Events Sydney Major Partners and industry bodies 
Business Events Sydney is pleased to work collaboratively with our Major Partners and industry bodies.

Major Partners:

 Destination NSW
 Sydney Harbour Foreshore Authority
 City of Sydney
 Sydney Convention and Exhibition Centre in Darling Harbour
 Accor

Industry bodies:

 Australian Tourism Export Council (ATEC)
 Association of Australia Convention Bureaux (AACB)
 Business Events Australia (BEA)
 Business Events Council of Australia
 Future Convention Cities Initiative (FCCI)
 International Congress and Convention Association (ICCA)
 Qantas
 Sydney Airport
 Sydney Business Chamber
 Sydney Olympic Park Authority
 Sydney Opera House
 Tourism and Transport Forum (TTF)

Sydney's ranking as a business event city 
Sydney has maintained the position as Australia's leading business events destination.

In 2011/12 financial year, Sydney:

 won a record 103 event bids with an economic impact of $225.6 million (an increase of 21% on the previous year)
 33 of these events were Asian business with an estimated economic impact of $91 million which will see 18,641 corporate incentive and meeting clients travel to Australia

Some highlight events secured by BESydney in FY11/12 include:

Perfect China Leadership Seminar 2013 – 3,500 delegates, worth an estimated economic impact of $20.9 million
 IUCN World Parks Congress 2014 – 3,000 delegates, worth an estimated $23.6 million
 12th Congress of the International Society for Organ Donation and Procurement (ISODP) 2013 – 400 delegates, worth an estimated $1.5 million

References

External links 
 

Companies based in Sydney
Event management companies of Australia
Tourism in Sydney